The King's University is a private evangelical university in Southlake, Texas.

History
The King's University was founded by Dr. Jack W. Hayford with The Church On The Way as The King’s College and Seminary, in Van Nuys, (San Fernando Valley), California, in 1997. In 2012, the school changed its name to become "The King's University" and opened a campus in Southlake, Texas sponsored by Gateway Church (Texas). In 2013, the main campus and administration left California and permanently  moved to Southlake.

References

External links
Official website

Evangelicalism in California
Evangelical universities and colleges in the United States
Pentecostalism in California
Universities and colleges in Los Angeles County, California